Durron Maurice Butler (born April 30, 1967), known as Turbo B, is an American musician, rapper and beatboxer. He was once the frontman of the German electronic music group Snap!

After completing a period of service with the United States Army in Germany, Butler went on tour with The Fat Boys. He was soon discovered by the managers of Snap!, and contributed to the albums World Power and The Madman's Return and their respective number one hits, "The Power" and "Rhythm Is a Dancer".

After leaving Snap!, Butler pursued a solo career and also formed the group Centory, which has several minor hits. Butler is known to tour with other artists who were prominent in the 1990s. He has since contributed to singles by Victoria Silvstedt, H-Blockx, Master Blaster and Regi Penxten.

Early years
Born in McKeesport, Pennsylvania, Butler started his music career as a drummer for a heavy metal band in his hometown. After joining the United States Army in July 1985, he completed basic training (C-4-3) at Fort Dix and was transferred to the 8th SC, Redstone Arsenal, AL for advanced training where he qualified to become an ammunition specialist. With his advanced training complete, he was sent to Friedberg, Germany to join the 60th Ordnance Company in Ray Barracks. After completing his service in the Army he returned to the USA but went back to Germany shortly thereafter to tour with The Fat Boys. In 1989 DJ Rico Sparx discovered his rapping talents and introduced him to  Snap! producers Michael Münzing and Luca Anzilotti (who were using the pseudonyms Benito Benites and John "Virgo" Garrett III); they chose him to replace Chill Rob G's vocals in their song "The Power". He chose the stage name Turbo B, which had been his nickname since childhood.

Success with Snap!
"The Power" became a major international hit, and Butler became recognizable as the frontman of the group. To promote the record he toured widely with Snap!, rapping his lyrics and also playing drums.

With the release of Snap!'s second album, Butler wanted the first single to be "Color of Love". "Rhythm Is a Dancer" was planned to be the first single, however he reportedly hated the song, especially his now infamous line "I'm serious as cancer when I say rhythm is a dancer". In December 1991 he got his wish but "Color of Love" went fairly unnoticed in the UK and US charts. Michael Münzing and Luca Anzilotti then insisted on releasing "Rhythm Is a Dancer" as the second single. It became the group's second major international hit. Butler left Snap! shortly after due to growing dissent with the group and its managers.

In 2000 Snap! and Turbo B rejoined for a comeback, and released the single "Gimme a Thrill". The single failed to chart and their planned upcoming album One Day on Earth was subsequently never released.

Solo career and Centory
After leaving Snap! Butler pursued a solo career, releasing the album Make Way for the Maniac in 1993 on Polydor Records. It featured the singles "I'm Not Dead", "Get Wild", "What You See" and "Nice & Smooth".

He went on to form the band Centory in 1994 with Gary Carolla, Delgado (Kevin Estevez), and Alex Trime (Eddie Gibson). They released the album Alpha Centory which spawned four minor hits in the European charts. Butler toured with Centory following their success. He did not feature in their last single, a cover of Milli Vanilli's Girl You Know It's True, which instead featured singer Trey D. The song was Centory's least successful single, reaching No. 50 in the German Charts.

Butler did not release any more solo material until 2005, when his single "New Day" was released under Holy Chaos Recordings. Butler still tours around the world with his music. He was a special guest at the 90's Festival in Russia and joined MC Hammer and Vanilla Ice on the Back 2 Cool tour in 2009.

Personal life
Butler is married and has two children, a daughter named Shannon and a son named DJ.

Discography

With Snap!
Albums

Singles

With Centory
Albums

Singles

Solo releases
Albums

Singles

Collaborations

References

External links
 Official website
 Turbo B at Myspace

1967 births
African-American male rappers
Living people
People from McKeesport, Pennsylvania
Rappers from Pennsylvania
Rappers from Pittsburgh
20th-century American drummers
American male drummers
East Coast hip hop musicians
21st-century American rappers
20th-century American male musicians
21st-century American male musicians
20th-century African-American musicians
21st-century African-American musicians
Snap! members